Ab Javan (also Romanized as Ab Javān and Ab-e Javān; also known as Āb-e Jahān, Ab Jahan, and Ābjahān) is a village in Balesh Rural District, in the Central District of Darab County, Fars Province, Iran. At the 2006 census, its population was 1,637, in 373 families.

References 

Populated places in Darab County